The Snelling Sevens (also known as the Snelling Seven-a-Side Trophy and originally known as the Welsh Seven-a-Side Tournament) was an annual Welsh Rugby Union sevens competition that ran from 1954 until 1995. 

The tournament was inaugurated in 1954 and the trophy presented by the Chairman of Newport Athletic Club, Reg Snelling, after whom the competition is named. The competition took place over a single day, and was originally a straightforward knockout tournament between 16 teams, with the initial draw taking place prior to the match day. The teams invited were the premier South Wales teams, but occasionally if a team was on tour at the time clubs were invited from other areas, including English teams such as Leicester and Bath.
Ebbw Vale won the tournament in 1958. The squad included G Powell, M Williams, F Matthews, R Morgan, D Ackerman, D Barrett, R Evans, K Cameron, J Pugh.
1967 saw the introduction of the Bill Everson Award for the Man of the Tournament Trophy. In 1979, the competition changed format from a purely knockout tournament to a pool system with four groups of four teams followed by knockout rounds.

Despite the competition's popularity from the 1950s to the 1970s, crowds diminished from 50,000 at its peak to around 5,000 by the 1980s and early 1990s. In 1995, the competition was renamed as the "Worthington Sevens", but it was decided that, due to the congested timetables of the clubs involved, the tournament should cease to be held. The trophy was awarded permanently to Newport as the most successful club in the competition's history.

Finals

External links 
 Official site of the Snelling Seven-A-Side Tournament

Rugby sevens competitions in Europe
Rugby union competitions in Wales
Defunct rugby union competitions in Europe
1954 establishments in Wales